The 2010 National Cricket League Twenty20 tournament in Bangladesh (abbreviated as NCL 1 2010 or the NCL T20 2010), played in April 2010, was the sole edition of a now-defunct Twenty20 league involving the teams in the National Cricket League (NCL). The tournament was initiated by the Bangladesh Cricket Board (BCB). It included six teams representing the divisions of Bangladesh. It was a limited success and has effectively been replaced by the Bangladesh Premier League (BPL). The tournament was won by the Rajshahi Rangers who defeated the Kings of Khulna by 6 wickets in the final at the Sher-e-Bangla National Cricket Stadium in Dhaka, the winning team's Qaiser Abbas being named "Man of the Match".

Background 
Bangladesh Cricket Board launched the first-ever National Cricket League T20 competition to be played from April 11 to 20 to prepare the national cricketers for the T20 World Cup.

Teams 
Six teams competed in the first edition of NCL Twenty20 tournament. Each team represented the six administrative divisions of Bangladesh:
 Barisal Blazers
 Cyclones of Chittagong
 Dhaka Dynamites
 Kings of Khulna
 Rajshahi Rangers
 Sultans of Sylhet

Franchises
Six companies bid to buy a team in the tournament. The companies went into a lottery of which they were to pick one of six "iconic" players from Bangladesh who were perceived to have outstanding ability. Each company then picked three of 18 players who had represented the Bangladesh national cricket team. They were categorised into a certain class, getting paid a certain amount of money. No player could cost more than 400,000 Taka.

Icon players
Each franchise had an "icon" player. Although originally suggested to have player auction, due to the shortage of time players were divided into Grades: A+, A, B, C, D with the A+ players receiving 4 lakh Bangladeshi Taka. Each team was allowed to list up to 6 foreign players but play a maximum of two. Most foreign players were from the Indian subcontinent including Shoaib Akhtar (Cyclones of Chittagong). Rajshahi Rangers signed Aiden Blizzard from Victoria, Australia.

Foreign players

Summary

Final standings

Head-to-head chart
{| class="wikitable" style="font-size: 75%; float:right;"
|- style="text-align: center"
| 
| 
|-
|}

Match scores

Media
ATN Bangla televised all matches live and showcased highlights. The official website was www.nclT20.com. All of the matches were played at the Sher-e-Bangla Cricket Stadium or BKSP in Dhaka, Bangladesh. Results can also be observed on www.cricinfo.com.

References

External links
Official site
Tournament Site

Bangladesh National Cricket League